is a railway station in Buzen, Fukuoka, Japan, operated by Kyūshū Railway Company (JR Kyushu).

Lines
Mikekado Station is served by the Nippō Main Line.

Adjacent stations

See also
 List of railway stations in Japan

External links

  

Railway stations in Fukuoka Prefecture
Railway stations in Japan opened in 1956